TM-38837 is a small molecule inverse agonist/antagonist of the CB1 cannabinoid receptor, with peripheral selectivity. It is being developed for the treatment of obesity and metabolic disorders by 7TM Pharma. The company has announced phase I clinical trials.

TM-38837 is among the first of a new generation of cannabinoid receptor antagonist designed to avoid the central nervous system liabilities of the first generation CB1 receptor antagonists such as rimonabant.

See also 
 AM-6545

References

External links 
 Experimental obesity drug avoids brain effects that troubled predecessors, press release

Anorectics
CB1 receptor antagonists
Peripherally selective drugs
Alkyne derivatives
Thiophenes
Chloroarenes
Trifluoromethyl compounds
Pyrazoles